William West Harvey (November 21, 1869 – September 27, 1958) was a member of the Kansas House of Representatives and an associate justice of the Kansas Supreme Court from January 8, 1923 to January 8, 1945, and chief justice from January 8, 1945 to March 1, 1956.

In 1906 he set up his own practice in Ashland, Kansas and in the same year became the Clark County attorney for one term.
He then went on to be the representative for Clark County starting in 1917 for three terms, including being elected speaker of the house in his third term. June 17, 1921 he was made Assistant Attorney General, he was the third member of his family to hold the position.

Harvey stood for the supreme court in 1922 against the incumbent Judson S. West who had already served two terms. Harvey won the number 2 position with 38% of the vote, just beating West who gained 37% of the vote.
In 1939 the retirement of Justice William Easton Hutchinson caused a shuffle of the court with only Justice Harvey and Chief Justice John Shaw Dawson keeping their places.
He then became the Chief Justice in 1945 filling the position vacated by the retirement of Chief Justice Dawson.

Harvey resigned as Chief Justice as of March 1, 1956 before the end of his full term with Justice William A. Smith being promoted to the Chief Justice position. The vacant No. 2 position on the court was filled by Harold R. Fatzer.

Both Harvey and his brother A.M. Harvey were thought to have been  members of the Ku Klux Klan.

Life and education 
He was born November 21, 1869 in Madison County, Kansas, moving to a farm near Berryton, Shawnee County, Kansas in 1877.
He graduated in 1896 from Emporia State Teachers College, going on to teach in rural schools and becoming the superintendent of Ellsworth city schools for two years.
He studied law privately and was admitted in 1898 to he Kansas Bar.
He owned a large ranch near to Ashland, Kansas.

Death 
He died of a heart attack on the way to hospital after collapsing in his home in Topeka, Kansas on Saturday September 27, 1958. His wife Marie had died a few years before him in 1952. He left behind a daughter Helen Righter and a son  Howard S. Harvey. He was buried in Ridgeway cemetery near Carbondale.

References

Chief Justices of the Kansas Supreme Court
Justices of the Kansas Supreme Court
Members of the Kansas House of Representatives
Speakers of the Kansas House of Representatives
Emporia State University alumni
1869 births
1958 deaths